Dale Mabry Highway is a north–south road in Tampa, Florida. The majority of its length consists of three lanes each direction plus a central turn-lane and often includes a right-turn lane. It begins at the MacDill Air Force Base entrance in South Tampa and ends by merging with US 41 just north of the Pasco County border. The highway carries multiple designations, carrying US 92 for an approximately five-mile stretch between Hillsborough Avenue and Gandy Boulevard.

Dale Mabry Highway has many items of interest, including Raymond James Stadium, George M. Steinbrenner Field, Tampa International Airport, the Dale Mabry branch of the Hillsborough Community College, Plant High School, Gaither High School, shopping centers, car dealerships and restaurants.

Route description
Dale Mabry Highway carries several designations throughout its route.

The lane counts along the highway are as follows.
Four lanes (divided) from MacDill AFB to Euclid Ave.
Four lanes (undivided) from Euclid Ave to Kennedy Boulevard (State Road 60).
Six lanes (mostly divided, with some segments containing center turn lane) from Kennedy Boulevard to Van Dyke Rd. With a brief four lane section at Hillsborough Ave.
Mostly six lanes (mostly divided, with some segments containing center turn lane) from Ehrlich Rd/Bearss Ave to State Road 568 (Veterans Expressway).
Four lanes (divided) from State Road 568 (Veterans Expressway) to US 41.

The speed limit for most of the length is 45 mph (72 km/h). There is a 55 mph (89 km/h) speed limit on the segment north of State Road 568.

MacDill Air Force Base to Gandy Boulevard (SR 573)
The southern portion of Dale Mabry Highway between MacDill AFB and Gandy Boulevard (US 92, SR 600) is designated as State Road 573's entire length.  This portion is also cosigned with unsigned SR 685.  This section is four lanes wide, divided.  Until the late 1990s, a Jai Alai fronton stood on the west side of the highway just south of Gandy Boulevard. The facility closed in July 1998 after 45 years of operation after the parent company of the fronton sold the  property for $8.3 million. Today, a Home Depot and Sam's Club store sit on the property.

Originally a two-lane stretch, a widening project took place in the 1970s, increasing the road to four lanes. The project was at least partly contributed by the construction of the Lee Roy Selmon Expressway in 1974. In 2002, a roundabout was constructed just north of the main gate to MacDill as part of a security enhancement and road improvement project for the base.

Gandy Boulevard to Hillsborough Avenue (US 92)
The section of Dale Mabry Highway between Gandy Boulevard and Hillsborough Avenue is signed as U.S. Route 92 (State Road 600).  Much of this portion is also cosigned with unsigned SR 685.  This stretch of Dale Mabry Highway snakes through several south Tampa business areas and a residential district before approaching Raymond James Stadium with the SR 685 concurrency ending at Henderson Boulevard.  The section of Dale Mabry between Gandy Boulevard and Kennedy Boulevard (SR 60) remains four lanes with moderate improvements taking place over the years, such as intersection improvements. The section of highway from Kennedy northward is six lanes with many businesses surrounding the highway.

Until 2000, the section of highway between Gandy Boulevard and Euclid Ave was two lanes. Additionally a 1950s era overpass stood over a CSX rail corridor just north of the Lee Roy Selmon Crosstown Expressway.  The overpass was torn down in the late 1990s and replaced with an at-grade railroad crossing as part of a widening project which increased that section to four lanes.

Hillsborough Avenue to Busch Boulevard/Gunn Highway (SR 580)
The section of Dale Marby Highway between Hillsborough Avenue and Busch Boulevard/Gunn Highway is signed as a portion of State Road 580.  The Hillsborough Avenue interchange is a remnant of a failed freeway plan along Dale Mabry Highway. The original North Crosstown Expressway was supposed to have connected Dale Mabry at this (or the MLK) intersection, but was killed as well. Along the highway in the stadium and Northdale area are many businesses, more specifically car dealerships. The overall scene along Dale Mabry however, begins to shift from to a more suburban setting. The Busch/Gunn Interchange at the end of this stretch is also a remnant of the canceled expressway.

Busch Boulevard/Gunn Highway to U.S. Route 41 (SR 597)
The northern portion of Dale Mabry Highway between Busch Boulevard/Gunn Highway and U.S. Route 41 is designated as State Road 597's entire length.  This section of Dale Mabry Highway continues to be four to six lanes north of Bearss Ave up to the Veterans Expressway. The line of businesses and apartment/condo developments continue along the highway until the Veterans Expressway.  North of the expressway, the highway changes to a more rural setting towards the terminus of US 41.

North of the expressway, the highway used to narrow back down to two lanes as it snaked through a rural setting to US 41. This scene has since changed, as Dale Mabry between the Veterans and US 41 was widened to four lanes in 1996.

Surfacing
Dale Mabry Highway is also one of the last roads in Hillsborough County to include concrete (driving surface) segments (Hillsborough Avenue and Bayshore Boulevard are the other major, non-interstate, arteries that have concrete segments). Originally, the concrete segment was continuous, stretching from MacDill AFB to just south of Hillsborough Ave. However, after numerous intersection modifications and widening over the years, some of the original areas have disappeared as they were replaced by asphalt surfaces. The existing concrete surfaces have since been rehabilitated, though there is a 1-mile (or less) exception between Spruce and Cypress Streets. The only reason why that noted section was not rehabilitated is because of pending reconstruction on Interstate 275.

History
Originally constructed in 1943 to connect MacDill Air Force Base with Drew Field, Dale Mabry Highway was named after Dale Mabry, a Florida native and World War I aviator. Dale Mabry runs along what was originally called Vera Ave. according to land plots from the Hillsborough County Property Appraiser. The highway has seen many changes throughout the years, including an extension to US 41 in Pasco County, and several major widening projects.

During the 1960s/1970s, a portion of Dale Mabry Highway was to be converted into a limited-access highway between what was then I-4 (now I-275) to the Northwest Hillsborough Expressway (now Veterans Expressway's eastern terminus). The plan was scrapped after overpasses over Hillsborough Avenue and Busch Boulevard were built, relieving congestion at what would be very busy intersections.

Dale Mabry Highway is typical of a roadway in a suburban sprawl setting. The road is a minimum four lanes wide along its entirety and in many places has wide medians, no sidewalks, and open drainage.

Major intersections

References

 Cancelled Hillsborough County Freeways

Transportation in Hillsborough County, Florida
Transportation in Pasco County, Florida
1943 establishments in Florida
U.S. Route 41
U.S. Route 92